The Cyprus Institute is a non-profit research and educational institution with a strong scientific and technological orientation, addressing issues of regional interest but of global significance, with an emphasis on cross-disciplinary research and international collaborations. It was formally established in 2005, and started operations in 2007.

The institute operates under the aegis of the Cyprus Research and Educational Foundation (CREF), which is governed by a board of trustees, composed of leading personalities of the international academic, political and business world; it is currently chaired by Dan-Olof Riska, Emeritus Professor of Physics at the University of Helsinki and treasurer and former president of the Finnish Society of Sciences and Letters.

The Cyprus Institute is being developed by establishing research centers which address challenging problems that are important at both the regional and international levels. Its research centers are developed in partnership with leading institutions in the respective thematic areas. The Energy, Environment and Water Research Center (EEWRC) is developed in partnership with the Massachusetts Institute of Technology, the Science and Technology in Archaeology Research Center (STARC) in partnership with the Centre de recherche et de restauration des musées de France, headquartered in the Louvre and the Computation-based Science and Technology Research Center (CaSToRC) in partnership with the University of Illinois. A fourth Center, the Climate and Atmosphere Research Center (CARE-C) was formally launched on January 1, 2020, within the framework of the European Commission Horizon-2020-TEAMING project “EMME-CARE” (Eastern Mediterranean and Middle East Climate and Atmosphere Research Centre; Grant no. 856612).

Multi-level founding partnerships with internationally prominent institutions ensure the development of the Centers in close collaboration with world leaders in their respective fields. Additional collaborations with other research and academic institutions together with local authorities further enhance the development. Having launched its first center in 2007, The Cyprus Institute has secured a large number of research projects, including an Advanced Grant from the European Research Council (ERC), three European Research Area Chairs (ERA Chairs), and three Marie Skłodowska-Curie European Joint Doctorates (EJD).

The Cyprus Institute is also an accredited, degree-granting institution of higher education, offering Master’s and PhD programs in thematic areas of its expertise to select students from around the world.

Planning phase

The planning for the establishment of the Cyprus Institute took place from 2000 to 2004 under the aegis of the Cyprus Development Bank led by J. Joannides and A. Mouskos. Aided by A. Stamatis, the CEO of the Bank of Cyprus Oncology Center together with a team of scholars, they shaped the core vision and undertook the coordination, research and planning of the Institute.

The team of academics consisted of:
 Professor Ernest J. Moniz of the Massachusetts Institute of Technology, who has served as Secretary of the US Department of Energy and as associate director of the White House Office of Science and Technology Policy;
 Professor Guy Ourisson of Louis Pasteur University, who served as president of the French Academy of Sciences and was the founding president of the Louis Pasteur University in Strasbourg;
 Professor Costas N. Papanicolas of the University of Athens, chairman at the time of the Council of Educational Evaluation-Accreditation (CEEA);
 Professor Frank H.T. Rhodes who has served as president of Cornell University; 
 Professor Herwig Schopper, who has served as general director of the European Organization for Nuclear Research (CERN) and as chair of the Scientific Council of the SESAME.

The planning phase was led by Prof. Costas N. Papanicolas, the current president of the pnstitute and CEO of CREF. The vision of the institute and its staged development spanning a ten-year period was presented, debated and endorsed by a convocation of international scholars held in Nicosia in June 2002. The convocation was chaired by Prof. Hubert Curien, former minister of research of France, who accepted the founding chairmanship of the CREF Board. Following endorsement by the international community, a plan for launching the institute was drafted, which was accepted and supported by the Cyprus Development Bank and the Government of Cyprus.

Institutional framework 

The Cyprus Institute is being developed under the institutional umbrella of the Cyprus Research and Educational Foundation (CREF), governed by a board which is international in its composition. The board is chaired by Prof. Dan-Olof Riska, emeritus professor of physics at the University of Helsinki and treasurer and former president of the Finnish Society of Sciences and Letters and includes world-renowned academics, all living presidents of the republic, regional and international political, civic and business leaders. The board is advised and aided by an international body of distinguished academics known as the Scientific Advisory Council.

The research centers
The research organization of the institute comprises cross-disciplinary research centers pursuing issues of scholarly relevance, global significance and regional focus. There are currently four active research centers.

 Energy, Environment and Water Research Center (EEWRC)
 Science and Technology in Archaeology and Culture Research Center (STARC)
 Computation-based Science and Technology Research Center (CaSToRC)
 Climate and Atmosphere Research Center (CARE-C)

Energy, Environment and Water Research Center (EEWRC)
The Energy, Environment and Water Research Center (EEWRC) is the first Research Center of the Cyprus Institute formally launched in December 2007. The EEWRC addresses science, technology, economic and policy issues related to major challenges in the energy, environment, climate and water fields of the Eastern Mediterranean. The current program is focused on research into the energy efficiency and renewable energies, most notably solar energy, environmental integrity, and the safeguarding and sustainable and holistic management of water resources in the region and in the EU. The Center's work covers topics such as integrated assessments of climate change, its impacts and socioeconomic consequences, and adequate adaptation and mitigation strategies; novel observational techniques aimed at assessing atmospheric, oceanic and Earth-surface properties; methodologies aimed at realizing a sustainable built environment, including innovative technologies and materials to harness the region's plentiful solar energy; and holistic approaches to an efficient and sustainable use of energy and water.

In the field of energy research, the Center aims to quantify the potential for reducing the use of hydrocarbon-based energy sources through enhanced energy efficiency and increased use of renewable, particularly solar energy for electrical power generation and the heating and cooling of buildings. It will explore novel technologies for producing, storing, and transmitting energy, with a focus on the applications of material sciences. In the field of environmental research, the EEWRC will first concentrate on evaluating regional climate change and its socio-economic impacts and will specify suitable and adequate adaptation strategies aimed at minimizing adverse effects of climate change, including associated political and social repercussions. The research agenda of EEWRC is based on an interdisciplinary, integrative approach involving all aspects of energy, water and environment-related sciences, including economic and policy research. The Center therefore aims to assemble experts in all the relevant physical, environmental, economical and political sciences. Moreover, such a research agenda requires access to powerful computing facilities, which will be provided within the framework of the Cyprus Institute.

The scientific issues on EEWRC's research agenda relate to the basic mission of the Center and to its four divisions, namely:
 Energy and renewable energy sources;
 Environment and climate change;
 Water and renewable natural resources;
 Economy and policies.

EEWRC is being developed under the guidance of the Massachusetts Institute of Technology.

Science and Technology in Archaeology Research Center (STARC)
The Science and Technology in Archaeology Research Center (STARC) is being developed jointly by The Cyprus Institute and the Centre de recherche et de restauration des musées de France, headquartered at the Louvre. STARC was launched in February 2009. The Center is devoted to the development, introduction and use of advanced scientific technologies in the domains of Archaeology and Cultural Heritage. The Mediterranean-Middle East region is one of the world's richest areas in terms of cultural heritage and archaeological remnants and thus offers a fertile ground for developing this line of research. Research topics derive from a use-inspired basic research approach. They include:
 Natural and Material Sciences applied to Archaeology and Cultural Heritage (CH);
 Digital Heritage (DH); Information and Communication Technologies (ICT), digital documentation and semantics, scientific visualization and virtual reality methods;
 Diagnostics for CH conservation, such as chemical and physical analysis for the preservation of heritage items;
 Underwater and maritime archaeology technology.

STARC is involved in various research activities. Research projects include the coordination of the Science and Technology for Archaeology and Cultural Heritage in the Eastern Mediterranean
(STACHEM). STACHEM will contribute to the development of a regional strategic plan for research infrastructures devoted to archaeological sciences and digital heritage in the Eastern Mediterranean, and participation in projects in Digital Cultural Heritage.

Computation-based Science and Technology Research Center (CaSToRC)
The Computation-based Science and Technology Research Center (CaSToRC) is being developed jointly with the University of Illinois and in particular with its National Center for Supercomputing Applications (NCSA), it was officially launched in February
2009. The Center is actively involved in research projects relating to improve the computing infrastructure of the Eastern Mediterranean region. Projects include the coordination of the regional LinkSCEEM project, which aims to establish user communities and ameliorate network connectivity in the region, and the European PRACE initiative, which will create a persistent pan-European High Performance Computing service.

CaSToRC will advance large-scale simulations of complex systems and use them to pursue scientific and engineering problems in areas such as advanced materials, the dynamics of macromolecules, climate change, atmospheric and ocean dynamics, physics and cosmology, digital libraries, advanced visualization and interactive human systems. The Center will provide an open user facility at the multi-teraflop scale and a portal to resources in Europe and the US at the petaflop scale, accessible to the Cypriot and regional scientific community. It plans to offer regional and international educational programs in computational science.
Initial activities of the Center are large-scale climate modeling, the analysis of the data generated by the SESAME synchrotron facility in Jordan, and the detailed storage and visualization of archaeological cultural information.

Climate and Atmosphere Research Center (CARE-C)
A regional Centre of Excellence for climate and atmosphere research in the Eastern Mediterranean and Middle East region. The Climate and Atmosphere Research Center (CARE-C) was formally launched on January 1, 2020, within the framework of the European Commission Horizon-2020-TEAMING project “EMME-CARE” (Eastern Mediterranean and Middle East Climate and Atmosphere Research Centre; Grant no. 856612).

References

External links
 

Educational institutions established in 2005
Research institutes in Cyprus
Technical universities and colleges in Cyprus
Universities and colleges in Cyprus
Education in Nicosia
2005 establishments in Cyprus